Gretchena deludana, the arrowhead moth, is a species of tortricid moth in the family Tortricidae.

The MONA or Hodges number for Gretchena deludana is 3259.

References

Further reading

External links

 

Eucosmini
Moths described in 1864